Syrian nationalism, also known as Pan-Syrian nationalism (or pan-Syrianism), refers to the nationalism of the region of Syria, as a cultural or political entity known as "Greater Syria".

It should not be confused with the Arab nationalism that is the official state doctrine of the Syrian Arab Republic's ruling Arab Socialist Ba'ath Party, nor should it be assumed that Syrian nationalism necessarily propagates the interests of modern-day Syria or its government. Rather, it predates the existence of the modern Syrian state (independent from French colonial rule in 1946), and refers to the loosely defined Levantine region of Syria, known in Arabic as Ash-Shām.

History

The formation of the Syrian state 
As in many other countries of the region, after the fall of the Ottoman empire the land now known as Syria was left without a common identity to bond the different ethnicities together. Already during the period of the Tanzimat, thinkers like Butrus al-Bustani, belonging to the Nahda movement, were claiming the existence of a natural Syrian nation, or Great Syria, also known as the region of the Levant.

Nonetheless, after World War I, the area was subject to the division in spheres of influence operated by the British and the French with the Sykes-Picot agreement. After a brief attempt in 1919 to establish an independent Arab Kingdom of Syria under King Faisal, in 1920 the territory was split in three separate regions under the control of France.

After years of conflict and revolts, in 1936 Syria managed to negotiate a treaty of independence from France and became a nation with Hashim al-Atassi as its first president. In the following years, Syria passed from being still under the influence of France, to being controlled by Vichy France in 1940 during World War II, to becoming again occupied by British and Free French forces with the 1941 Syria–Lebanon campaign.

After a five years long struggle, and with the end of the war, on the 17th April 1946 Syria became a recognized independent state. However, the Israeli–Palestinian conflict of 1948, and the rise of pan-Arabist nationalist movements, led to multiple coups d'état, the most famous that of 1949 by Husni al-Za'im. It is during this revolutionary period that the Ba'ath Socialist Party emerges for the first time.

The party, founded in 1947 was promoting pan-Arabist ideas and anti-imperialist tendencies, it quickly gained popularity becoming in the 1954 elections the second biggest party in the Syrian parliament.  The Ba'ath party played a major role in offering the Syrian community a new imagined identity that could even connect them to other countries in the Arab world under existent traditions.

Syrian nationalism history 
Syrian nationalism instead arose as a modern school of thought in the late 19th century, in conjunction with the Nahda movement, then sweeping the Ottoman-ruled Arab world.

The first Syrian nationalist is considered to be Butrus al-Bustani, a Mount Lebanon-born convert from the Maronite Church to Protestantism, who started one of the region's first newspapers, Nafir Suria in Beirut in the aftermath of the Mount Lebanon civil war of 1860 and the massacre of Christians in Damascus in the same year. Bustani, who was deeply opposed to all forms of sectarianism, said Ḥubb al-Waṭan min al-Īmān ("Love of the Homeland is a matter of Faith").

As early as 1870, when discerning the notion of fatherland from that of nation and applying the latter to Greater Syria, Francis Marrash would point to the role played by language, among other factors, in counterbalancing religious and sectarian differences, and thus, in defining national identity. This distinction between fatherland and nation was also made by Hasan al-Marsafi in 1881.

After 1941, the Prime Minister of Iraq Nuri Pasha al-Said expressed his support for a Greater Syrian country that includes Iraq, Syria, Lebanon, Palestine and Jordan. Although this never happened.

Pan-Syrianism vs. Pan-Arabism 
Syrian nationalism articulated along two branches: pan-Syrianism and pan-Arabism.

The former and older one, believes in the existence of a Greater Syria, covering the area of the Levant, referring to ancient conceptions of the region. This movement is based on feeling of belonging dictated by the land and the culture, but not necessarily on religion: it is in fact tolerant towards Syria's ethnic diversity and multiplexity.

Although pan-Syrianism includes the idea that the nation is a part of the Arab world, it is also claims Syria as leader of the Arab people, opposing therefore pan-Arabist movements that would position all Arabs on the same level. The movement culminated in the creation of a party, the Syrian Social Nationalist Party (SSNP) founded in 1932 by Antun Saadeh.

Ideology

Syrian nationalism 
Syrian nationalism posited a common Syrian history and nationality, grouping all the different religious sects and variations in the area, as well as the region's mixture of different peoples. However, Greater Syria does not have a history as a state, and its inhabitants do not identify as members of a Greater Syrian nation. The idea of a Greater Syria is not inherently political; it bases itself on culture, seeing that people from the region share many traditions. Pan-Syrian nationalism can be distinguished in two forms: a pragmatic and a pure form. The pragmatic form accepts pan-Arabism and sees the building of Greater Syria as a step forward to building an Arab nation. The pure form completely rejects the idea of an Arab nation, stating that Greater Syria is a complete nation on its own.

Syrian nationalism is a generally secular movement, believing that a Syrian can have any religion indigenous to the area: Sunni or Shia Muslim, Christian or Jewish. This has attracted many Christians to it (as well as to the equally non-religious Arab nationalism), since the Christian churches form a religious minority in the Middle East, and often fear being dwarfed by Muslim majority populations. Syria's geography as a crossroads also explains the diversity of the area of Syria. 
Syrian nationalism often advocates a "Greater Syria", based on ancient concepts of the boundaries of the region then known as "Syria" (stretching from southern Turkey through Lebanon, Palestine into Jordan), but also including Cyprus, Iraq, Kuwait, the Ahvaz region of Iran, the Sinai Peninsula, and the Kilikian region of Turkey.

Historically, it is mostly after the end of the First World War that the pan-Syrian nationalism became very political with the creation of many political parties from the Syrian diaspora. Amongst these organizations were: the Syrian Union Party and the Syrian Moderates Party (both originating in Cairo); the National Democratic Party (Buenos Aires); the New Syria Party and the Syrian National Society (both in the United States). The National Democratic Party, the Syrian Moderates Party, the New Syria Party and the Syrian National Society advocated a unified, federated and independent state of Greater Syria, with the United States as a guarantor of its independence. However, this nationalism did not last for long as these parties sympathized with Lebanese and Arab nationalisms. The only party that did not wane is the Syrian Social Nationalist Party, later founded.

Role of language 
As the pan-Syrian ideology is based on a shared geographical culture, it is open to different opinions about the state of languages. The pan-Arabism seemed to exclude minorities as they would not necessarily speak Arabic, the pan-Syrian ideology gained followers. While al-Bustani considered Standard Arabic an essential part of this identity, Saadeh considered Arabic to be one of the many languages of the Syrian people and instead believed that if a national language has to be used for shared communication and written culture, without losing everyone's other language, it has to be 'Syrianised' Arabic.

Syrian Social Nationalist Party (SSNP)
A modern-day political movement that advocates the Greater Syria's borders with a pure form of pan-Syrian nationalism is the Syrian Social Nationalist Party (SSNP), founded in 1932 by Antun Saadeh.

Syrian-Israeli conflict
The SSNP considers the reason for its loss of territory to the "foreign" Israelis is that many Syrians embraced pan-Arab views which lead to the dominance of Egypt and Saudi Arabia over the conflict, where they did not care about sacrificing what Syrians had for their agenda and personal benefits instead of limiting other non-Syrian Arabs to supporting Syrians' decisions. According to Antoun, this happened when the Syrians had a weak ideology that did not unite them.

See also
 Fertile Crescent

References